The following events occurred in January 1926:

Friday, January 1, 1926
Flooding of the Rhine river struck Cologne; 50,000 were forced to evacuate their homes.
Ireland's first regular radio service, 2RN (later Radio Éireann), began broadcasting.
In "the game that changed the South", the Alabama Crimson Tide won the 1926 Rose Bowl with a 20–19 win over the Washington Huskies.

Saturday, January 2, 1926
Flooding continued to ravage Europe, from England to Romania, due to heavy rains and unseasonably high temperatures.
Born:
Harold Bradley, country music guitarist; in Nashville, Tennessee (d. 2019)
Howard Caine, actor; in North Hollywood, Los Angeles (d. 1993)
Bruce Harlan, American Olympic diver and University of Michigan diving coach; in Marple Newtown, Pennsylvania (d. 1959)

Sunday, January 3, 1926
Theodoros Pangalos declared himself dictator in Greece.
Born: George Martin, producer of The Beatles, in London (d. 2016)

Monday, January 4, 1926

The Parliament of Romania ratified the acceptance of Crown Prince Carol's renunciation of his right to the throne in the wake of his scandalous affair with Magda Lupescu, the Roman Catholic daughter of a Jewish pharmacist. His four-year-old son Michael became the new Crown Prince. Carol later reneged on the renunciation and reigned as King of Romania from 1930 to 1940.
Died: Margherita of Savoy, 74, queen consort of Italy

Tuesday, January 5, 1926
In the United Kingdom, the first Widow's Pensions were paid out at post offices. 
Born: W.D. Snodgrass, poet, in Beaver Falls, Pennsylvania (d. 2009)

Wednesday, January 6, 1926
The airline Deutsche Luft Hansa was founded in Berlin.
Born: Mickey Hargitay, bodybuilder and actor, in Budapest (d. 2006)

Thursday, January 7, 1926
Ongoing downpours in Europe submerged Great War cemeteries in France and flooded the London subway system.
The 15th Canadian Parliament was seated. William Lyon Mackenzie King continued as Prime Minister despite the Conservatives winning more seats in the last federal election, by forming a coalition with the Progressives. King did not even have his own seat as he'd lost his York North, Ontario, riding.
The Royal Academy of Italy was created.

Friday, January 8, 1926

Abdul-Aziz ibn Saud was crowned King of Hejaz in a ceremony at the Grand Mosque of Mecca.
Bảo Đại became Emperor of Vietnam.
Born: Chester Feldman, American game show producer, in The Bronx, New York (d. 1997); Evelyn Lear, operatic soprano, in Brooklyn, New York (d. 2012); Hanae Mori, fashion designer, in Yoshika, Shimane, Japan (d. 2022); and Soupy Sales, comedian, in Franklinton, North Carolina (d. 2009)

Saturday, January 9, 1926
The Navy League of the United States released a report finding the United States Navy to be unprepared for war and well short of the tonnage limitation set by the Washington Naval Treaty.
A band of twenty Mexican rebels opened fire aboard the Guadalajara-Mexico City train, then looted and burned the train. An estimated twenty to fifty people were killed and about 300,000 pesos (about $150,000 US) worth of cash and bar silver were stolen.

Sunday, January 10, 1926
Mexican federal troops tracked down bandits responsible for the previous evening's train massacre to a ranch in Jalisco and engaged them in a shootout. Most of the rebels were killed in the fighting, and eight who were captured were immediately executed. All the stolen loot was recovered.

Monday, January 11, 1926
The Whittemore Gang robbed Belgian diamond merchants Albert Goudris and Emanuel Veerman on West 48th Street in Manhattan, making off with $175,000 in gems.
Born: Lev Dyomin, astronaut, in Moscow (d. 1998)

Tuesday, January 12, 1926

Freeman Gosden and Charles Correll premiered their radio program Sam 'n' Henry, in which the two white performers portray two black characters from Harlem looking to strike it rich in the big city. It was a precursor to Gosden and Correll's more popular later program, Amos 'n' Andy.
The Pasteur Institute in Paris announced the discovery of an anti-tetanus serum.
As known well synthetic fiber brand, Toray was founded in Japan, as predecessor name was Toyo Rayon.
Born: Ray Price, U.S. country music singer, in Perryville, Texas (d. 2013)

Wednesday, January 13, 1926
A mine explosion in Wilburton, Oklahoma, killed 91.
Britain and Iraq signed a new treaty extending their relations for 25 years or until Iraq joined the League of Nations.

Thursday, January 14, 1926
German Foreign Minister Gustav Stresemann warned that the Locarno Pact was at risk of breaking down, as Germany accused the Allied powers of infringing on the limits on troops they were allowed to station in the Rhineland.
A total solar eclipse occurred.
Born: Tom Tryon, actor and writer, in Hartford, Connecticut (d. 1991)

Friday, January 15, 1926
Turkey adopted the Swiss Civil Code as part of the ongoing reforms instituted by President Mustafa Kemal Atatürk.
The film The Sea Beast, starring John Barrymore, was released.
Born: Maria Schell, actress, in Vienna (d. 2005)
Died: Louis Majorelle, 66, French furniture designer

Saturday, January 16, 1926
A BBC comic radio play broadcast by Ronald Knox about a workers' revolution caused a panic in London.

Sunday, January 17, 1926

Twenty-year-old Ayn Rand left Russia, departing from Leningrad by train. Her early life experiences in Communist Russia were a major influence on her philosophy.
Born: Moira Shearer, ballet dancer and actress, in Dunfermline, Scotland (d. 2006)

Monday, January 18, 1926
The Italianization of South Tyrol escalated as the government issued a decree requiring citizens of South Tyrol to Italianize any names and titles of nobility "which have been translated into other languages or deformed by foreign orthography or foreign endings." Failure to comply carried a fine of up to 1,000 lira.

Tuesday, January 19, 1926
Lev Karakhan, the Soviet ambassador to China, sent a protest to the Chinese Foreign Ministry warning of "serious consequences" if a dispute over the two countries' joint management of the Chinese Eastern Railway was not resolved. Manchurian warlord Zhang Zuolin had been seizing parts of the railway line and arresting Soviet officials in retaliation for a decision that made Chinese troops pay half-fare instead of being allowed to ride for free. The dispute was a precursor to the Sino Soviet Conflict of 1929.
Born: Fritz Weaver, actor, in Pittsburgh, Pennsylvania (d. 2016)

Wednesday, January 20, 1926
German Chancellor Dr. Hans Luther formed his second cabinet, a minority coalition involving the Centre Party, German People's Party and  National People's Party. 
Born: Patricia Neal, actress, in Packard, Kentucky (d. 2010); and David Tudor, American pianist and composer, in Philadelphia (d. 1996)

Thursday, January 21, 1926
The Chinese Eastern Railway dispute worsened as the general manager of the railway, A.N. Isonov, was arrested by Zhang Zuolin's troops.
The Belgian Parliament accepted the Locarno Treaties.
The D.H. Lawrence novel The Plumed Serpent was published.
Born: Steve Reeves, bodybuilder and actor, in Glasgow, Montana (d. 2000); and Franco Evangelisti, composer, in Rome (d. 1980)
Died: Camillo Golgi, 82, Austrian physician, pathologist, scientist and Nobel laureate

Friday, January 22, 1926
Soviet Foreign Minister Georgy Chicherin sent a threatening note to the Manchurian government seeking "permission" for the Soviet army to enter Manchuria if the Chinese Eastern Railway's administration was not restored. Manchuria responded by agreeing to comply, ending the crisis.

Saturday, January 23, 1926
The Shrine Auditorium opened in Los Angeles.
Born: Bal Thackeray, Indian politician, in Pune, India (d. 2012)
Died: Désiré-Joseph Mercier, 74, Belgian cardinal

Sunday, January 24, 1926
The Third International Radio Week began, featuring transatlantic tests of distance reception. Listeners in New York and Chicago reported successful reception of English and South American radio broadcasts.

Monday, January 25, 1926
British surgeon Sir Berkeley Moynihan says cancer of the tongue is partly caused by smoking.
Born: Bob Clarke, illustrator, in Mamaroneck, New York (d. 2013)

Tuesday, January 26, 1926

Scottish inventor John Logie Baird demonstrated a mechanical television system for members of the Royal Institution and a reporter from The Times at his London laboratory.
Galician aviator Ramón Franco completed a Trans-Atlantic flight from Huelva, Spain to Buenos Aires, Argentina. There were stopovers at Gran Canaria, Cape Verde, Pernambuco, Rio de Janeiro and Montevideo along the way. The 10,270 km journey was completed in 59 hours and 39 minutes.

Wednesday, January 27, 1926
The U.S. Senate voted in favor of joining the World Court, but with several specific reservations.
30 communists and 12 monarchists were wounded in street fighting in the Charlottenburg district of Berlin during demonstrations on the birthday of the former Kaiser, Wilhelm II. The fighting broke out as communists paraded an effigy of the ex-Kaiser hanged from a gallows. Riot police opened fire after attempts to separate the combatants were met with attacks from both sides.
Born: Fritz Spiegl, musician, journalist and broadcaster, in Zurndorf, Austria (d. 2003); and Ingrid Thulin, actress, in Sollefteå, Sweden (d. 2004)

Thursday, January 28, 1926
King Albert, Marshal Ferdinand Foch, the Archbishop of Canterbury and Cardinal Louis-Ernest Dubois were among the attendees for the funeral of Belgian cardinal and national hero Désiré-Joseph Mercier, who died on January 23. Thousands lined the streets of Brussels to watch the funeral procession. 
Died: Katō Takaaki, 66, 24th Prime Minister of Japan; and Ernest Troubridge, 63, Royal Navy officer

Friday, January 29, 1926
Eugene O'Neill's play The Great God Brown opened at the Greenwich Theatre.
Born: Abdus Salam, Pakistani theoretical physicist and Nobel Prize laureate, in Jhang (d. 1996)

Saturday, January 30, 1926
27 miners were killed in a gas explosion in Mossboro, Alabama; 26 escaped unhurt.
The Allied occupation of the first zone of the Rhineland ended. At 15:00 hours the British, French and Belgians in the zone all hauled down their flags and withdrew their remaining troops in advance of much of the Rhineland's sovereignty being formally returned to Germany at the stroke of midnight. 
Died: Barbara La Marr, 29, American actress (complications from tuberculosis)

Sunday, January 31, 1926

Italian Prime Minister Benito Mussolini assumed the power to rule by decree.
Died: Lou Bierbauer, 60, American baseball player

References

1926
1926-01
1926-01